Basson is a French surname, and means Bass. It may refer to:

 Alaric Basson, South African swimmer
 De Wet Basson, South African golfer
 Lucia Basson, Namibian politician
 Wouter Basson, South African cardiologist

French-language surnames